The Vermont Catamounts women's ice hockey program represented the University of Vermont during the 2018–19 NCAA Division I women's ice hockey season.

Offseason

Recruiting

Departures

Regular season

Standings

Schedule

Roster

References

Vermont Catamounts women's ice hockey seasons
2018 in sports in Vermont
2019 in sports in Vermont
2018–19 NCAA Division I women's hockey season